Abraham Rodriguez (born July 19, 2002) is an American professional soccer player who plays as a goalkeeper for Major League Soccer club Colorado Rapids. He signed a Homegrown Player contract with the Rapids in February 2020.

Club career 
Rodriguez joined the Colorado Rapids Development Academy during the 2016-17 season with the U-14s. Rodriguez made his professional debut on March 30, 2019, at 16 years old for Colorado Springs Switchbacks FC in the USL Championship in a 2-2 draw against Phoenix Rising FC. Rodriguez made 11 saves, including a penalty kick attempt from Solomon Asante in the 79th minute. Rodriguez was recognized as USL Championship Player of the Week in Week 4, becoming the second-youngest player ever to do so. Rodriguez was huge again as Switchbacks FC lost 2-1 in extra time against New Mexico United in the third round of the 2019 Lamar Hunt U.S. Open Cup on May 29. Rodriguez signed a USL Championship contract with Switchbacks FC on Aug. 8. Rodriguez was named to the USL Championship's 20 Under 20 for 2019.

At 16 years old, Rodriguez signed a Homegrown contract with the Rapids on Feb. 20, 2020. Rodriguez was one of four players loaned to Switchbacks FC on Feb. 21. Rodriguez made five starts for Switchbacks FC and earned his first professional clean sheet against El Paso Locomotive FC on Aug. 22. In March 2021, Rodriguez re-joined Colorado Springs on loan for the 2021 season.

Personal life 
Rodriguez is of Mexican descent and holds dual American and Mexican citizenship.

References

External links
Profile at US Development Academy

2002 births
Living people
Colorado Rapids players
Colorado Springs Switchbacks FC players
American soccer players
Association football goalkeepers
People from Thornton, Colorado
Soccer players from Colorado
Sportspeople from the Denver metropolitan area
USL Championship players
Homegrown Players (MLS)
Colorado Rapids 2 players
MLS Next Pro players
Major League Soccer players